Kyriakos Pavlou (born September 4, 1986) is a Cypriot footballer who plays for P.O. Xylotymbou. He is the brother of singer Maria Kyriakou

Club career
Pavlou debuted for AEK Larnaca F.C. in 2002. His nickname is Koullis. In 2006, he transferred to the Greek team Panionios F.C. After failing to make the starting line-up in any competitive matches, he returned to Cyprus and AC Omonia. Since then, he has been on loan to other clubs and last played for Ermis Aradippou and Diagoras F.C. in Second Division of Greece. In 2011, he returned to Cyprus to play for APOP Kinyras Peyias FC but the team relegated. On March 23, 2011 he signed a 3-year contract with AEK Larnaca F.C.

P.O. Xylotymbou
On 18 January 2019 he signed a 6-month contract with P.O. Xylotymbou.

International career
Pavlou has been capped 9 times with Cyprus national football team without scoring any goal. His first appearance with Cyprus  was on 19 May 2008 in a friendly lost 2-0 from Greece in Patra.

Honours
AEK Larnaca
 Cypriot Cup: 2003–04

References

External links
 
 

1986 births
Living people
Cypriot footballers
Cyprus international footballers
AEK Larnaca FC players
Panionios F.C. players
AC Omonia players
Ermis Aradippou FC players
APOP Kinyras FC players
Nea Salamis Famagusta FC players
Aris Limassol FC players
Enosis Neon Paralimni FC players
P.O. Xylotymbou players
Super League Greece players
Cypriot First Division players
Cypriot Second Division players
Cypriot expatriate footballers
Expatriate footballers in Greece
Association football midfielders
Diagoras F.C. players
People from Larnaca